The Loveday Loyalty is the seventh book in the Loveday series written by Kate Tremayne.

Plot summary

Against the dramatic scenery of Cornwall, the turbulent criminal underworld of London and the climactic events of the French revolution. In this seventh novel in the series, life with the Lovedays is not confined to England and France. America has won its independence but the Lovedays have connections in Virginia and the new penal colony in Australia has become the residence of one Loveday who took a chance too many. Loyalty to and pride in the Loveday name has held the family together through unstable times, but with the fierce rivalry that exists between family members, will loyalty be enough to honour the family's heritage?

2005 British novels
Novels by Kate Tremayne
Novels set in Cornwall
Historical romance novels
British romance novels